Abdul Khalid bin Ibrahim (14 December 1946 – 31 July 2022) was a Malaysian politician who served as the 14th Menteri Besar of Selangor from 2008 to 2014. He was the Member of the Selangor State Assembly (MLA) for Ijok from 2008 to 2013, and MLA for Pelabuhan Klang from 2013 to 2018. At the same time, he served as Member of Parliament (MP) for Bandar Tun Razak from 2013 to 2018.

Khalid was a member of the People's Justice Party (PKR), but became an independent in August 2014, coinciding with his resignation as Menteri Besar. He was sacked from the party for his refusal to vacate his Selangor Menteri Besar post, in a political manoeuvre that was widely criticised by the public and invoked a rare rebuke from the Sultan of Selangor.

During his tenure as Menteri Besar, Khalid prioritised sensible spending of the state government's coffers, initiating many projects and policies that benefitted Selangor state. As a result, he was well-liked by the people of Selangor.

Early life and career 
Abdul Khalid bin Ibrahim was born on 14 December 1946 in the village of Kampung Jalan Raja Abdullah in Kuala Selangor, Selangor. He was educated at the Jeram Malay School in 1956, attended the Special Malay Class, and then studied at the Kampung Kuantan English School.

Khalid obtained a Bachelor of Economics (BEc) with honours from the University of Malaya and a Master of Business Administration (MBA) from the University of Queensland in 1975.

Khalid began his career as a university lecturer. In 1979, he joined the United Malays National Organisation (UMNO), the leading party in Malaysia's ruling Barisan Nasional (BN) coalition. In the same year, he became the chief executive of the government-controlled fund management firm Permodalan Nasional Berhad (PNB), a position he held until 1994. In 1981, he became famous for leading the "dawn raid" on the London Stock Exchange, which resulted in PNB gaining a 51% share in British plantation concern Guthrie in less than two hours. He later became the CEO of the Malaysianized Guthrie, now known as Kumpulan Guthrie Bhd, from 1995 to 2003.

Political career
In 2006, Khalid joined the opposition PKR, founded by the former deputy prime minister Anwar Ibrahim, and became the party's treasurer-general. The party selected him as its candidate for a by-election for the Selangor State Legislative Assembly seat of Ijok, which he lost to K. Parthiban of the Malaysian Indian Congress (MIC), a component party of the ruling Barisan Nasional (BN) coalition.

In the 2008 general election, he contested the federal parliamentary seat of Bandar Tun Razak and re-contested the Selangor State Assembly seat of Ijok. He won both seats, while the opposition Pakatan Rakyat coalition made unprecedented gains and took a majority in the Selangor State Assembly. Khalid was appointed the Menteri Besar of Selangor and was sworn in on 13 March 2008. He was the first person not of the BN coalition to hold the post.

In his first term, Khalid's government implemented a policy of delivering to each Selangor household an initial 20 cubic metres of water each year free of charge. The State Assembly also passed the country's first freedom of information legislation. It was in these areas—social policy and government transparency—that his administration was able to make the most progress. But in some cases, differences between the partners in the governing coalition, which included the Democratic Action Party (DAP) and the Pan-Malaysian Islamic Party (PAS) proved difficult to reconcile. For example, in 2009 Khalid rejected a move by PAS to draft legislation banning the sale of alcohol in Muslim-majority neighbourhoods.

In the 2013 general election, Khalid's Pakatan Rakyat coalition increased its majority in the Selangor State Assembly, winning 44 out of its 56 seats. Though Khalid's PKR won fewer seats than the DAP and PAS, he retained the position of Menteri Besar.

Resignation as Menteri Besar
In early 2014, PKR's national leader, Anwar Ibrahim, then a federal parliamentarian, sought to contest the Selangor State Assembly seat of Kajang in a by-election. The so-called "Kajang Move" would have allowed Anwar to oust Khalid as Menteri Besar with PKR's support. Anwar's conviction on a charge of sodomy caused Anwar's wife, Wan Azizah Wan Ismail, to take over Anwar's presidency of PKR and the nomination as PKR candidate in the by-election instead, which she won. In July, the party nominated Wan Azizah as its preferred Menteri Besar. The following month, Khalid was expelled from the party after he refused to comply with its direction for him to resign as the state's premier and make way for Wan Azizah. Khalid sacked the PKR and DAP members of Selangor's Cabinet-like Executive Council, and continued to administer the state as an independent assemblyman with the remaining four councillors from PAS. Khalid ultimately resigned on 26 August 2014, as it was clear that he could no longer command the confidence of the State Assembly. He remained in office while Sultan Sharafuddin deliberated on whom to appoint his replacement, before settling on PKR's deputy president Azmin Ali, who was sworn in on 23 September 2014. After Azmin assumed office, the Sultan praised Khalid for leading the state "successfully and perfectly" and criticised the manner in which he had been ousted from the state's premiership by his own party.

Election results

Death
Khalid died of a heart valve infection on 31 July 2022 at 11.08pm at Cardiac Vascular Sentral Hospital, Kuala Lumpur, at age 76. Khalid's remains were brought to the Saidina Umar Al-Khattab Mosque in Bukit Damansara for prayers the next day, before lying in state at the Sultan Salahuddin Abdul Aziz Shah Mosque, Shah Alam, for the public to pay their last respects. At the personal request of the Sultan of Selangor, Sultan Sharafuddin Idris Shah, Khalid was laid to rest at the Shah Alam Royal Mausoleum; burials at the mausoleum are usually reserved for members of the Selangor Royal Family and the nobility. Sultan Sharafuddin and the Tengku Laksamana of Selangor, Tengku Sulaiman Shah, attended the ceremony.

Legacy and assessment
Khalid Ibrahim was the first Menteri Besar of Selangor since independence who was not from the then-dominant Barisan Nasional coalition. As such, his tenure saw radical administrative and policy changes in Selangor. Upon taking office, he applied his corporate experience to his new position, running the state "like a conglomerate". He valued efficiency and hard work, was frugal with state expenditures, and preoccupied with clean governance. Khalid had a propensity for understanding the workings of large organisations, the failings of governments and corporations, and providing solutions thereto. Firmly believing that state monies should go back to the people of Selangor, Khalid initiated the Merakyatkan Ekonomi Selangor ("state revenue channelled back to the people") program, a slogan that was much imitated in the following years. Due to his austere economic policies, Selangor recorded its strongest savings reserves up to that point, amounting to RM3.3 billion by the time he left office in 2014. Khalid also introduced the programme for Selangor households to receive 20 cubic metres of free water every year, a policy that is still in place as at 2022.

Under Khalid's progressive administration, the Selangor Legislative Assembly passed the country’s first freedom of information enactment, in an effort to promote transparent governance and democratisation of information. He also abolished direct negotiations for state projects, and instructed that tenders be awarded based on the collective decision of the executive council and relevant state government officers, without seeking the Menteri Besar's endorsement.

At the same time, his tendency to act independently, as well as his relative indifference to party politics, earned him the enmity of party colleagues. The political machinations that engineered his downfall were not well-received by Selangorians and the Sultan himself, and PKR was criticised for its removal of a highly-regarded Menteri Besar at the height of his popularity. Nevertheless, upon his enforced dismissal, Khalid sat out the rest of his terms as an MP and Member of the Legislative Assembly, whereupon he retired quietly from politics, serving as a consultant to several corporations and state governments. His various policies benefitting the state of Selangor made him beloved among many Selangorians, and he was widely mourned upon his passing, his death being seen as a great loss to the state.

Honours

Honours of Malaysia
  :
  Commander of the Order of Loyalty to the Crown of Malaysia (PSM) – Tan Sri (1998)
  :
  Knight Commander of the Order of the Crown of Selangor (DPMS) – Dato' (1988)
  Knight Grand Commander of the Order of the Crown of Selangor (SPMS) – Dato' Seri (2009)
  :
  Knight Companion of the Order of Sultan Ahmad Shah of Pahang (DSAP) – Dato' (1990)

References

1946 births
2022 deaths
Chief Ministers of Selangor
Malaysian people of Malay descent
Malaysian businesspeople
Malaysian Muslims
Independent politicians in Malaysia
Former People's Justice Party (Malaysia) politicians
Former United Malays National Organisation politicians
People from Selangor
Members of the Dewan Rakyat
Members of the Selangor State Legislative Assembly
Selangor state executive councillors
University of Malaya alumni
University of Queensland alumni
Commanders of the Order of Loyalty to the Crown of Malaysia
Knights Grand Commander of the Order of the Crown of Selangor
Knights Commander of the Order of the Crown of Selangor